

Gmina Resko is an urban-rural gmina (administrative district) in Łobez County, West Pomeranian Voivodeship, in north-western Poland.

Villages
Apart from the town of Resko, Gmina Resko contains the villages and settlements of Bezmoście, Dorowo, Gardzin, Godziszewo, Gozdno, Iglice, Komorowo, Krosino, Łabuń Mały, Łabuń Wielki, Łagiewniki, Łosośnica, Łosośniczka, Lubień Dolny, Lubień Górny, Luboradz, Ługowina, Miłogoszcz, Mokronos, Mołstowo, Naćmierz, Orzeszkowo, Piaski, Policko, Porąbka, Potuliny, Prusim, Przemysław, Sąpólko, Sienno, Siwkowice, Słowikowo, Smólsko, Sosnówko, Sosnowo, Stara Dobrzyca, Stołążek, Święciechowo, Świekotki, Taczały, Trzaski and Żerzyno.

Neighbouring gminas
Gmina Resko is bordered by the gminas of Łobez, Nowogard, Płoty, Radowo Małe, Rymań, Sławoborze and Świdwin.

See also
 History of Pomerania

References
Polish official population figures 2006

Resko
Łobez County